Caecossonus dentipes is a species of true weevil in the beetle family Curculionidae are the family of the "true" weevils (or "snout beetles"). They are one of the largest animal families, with 5,489 genera and 82,741[1] species described worldwide. It is found in North America. a molytine tribe endemic to Central America, the Caribbean Islands and some areas of the USA (blind genera are, among others, Caecossonus Gilbert, 1955; Decuanellus Osella, 1977; Pseudoalaocybites Osella, 1980).

References

Further reading

 
 

Molytinae
Articles created by Qbugbot
Beetles described in 1955